Roger Tiriau (22 October 1928 – 21 August 1984) was a French sailor who competed in the 1968 Summer Olympics.

References

External links
 

1928 births
1984 deaths
French male sailors (sport)
Olympic sailors of France
Sailors at the 1956 Summer Olympics – 12 m2 Sharpie
Sailors at the 1968 Summer Olympics – 5.5 Metre